Calodiscus is a genus of Eodiscinid trilobite in the family Calodiscidae. It lived during the late Lower Cambrian, with remains found in Canada (Newfoundland & Labrador), the United States (Massachusetts, New York State), Greenland, The United Kingdom (England), Sweden, France, Germany, Italy (Sardinia), Kazakhstan, the Russian Federation and China.

The type species by original designation is Agnostus lobatus Hall, 1847 from the upper part of the lower Cambrian Browns Pond Formation (formerly Schodack Formation) at Troy in the Taconic region of New York State, USA [= Calodiscus korolevi Pokrovskaya in Ergaliev and Pokrovskaya, 1977; Calodiscus lakei Rasetti, 1952; and  Calodiscus n. sp. A of Geyer, 1988, according to Cederström et al., 1988].

Lochman (1956) demonstrated that Calodiscus agnostoides (Kobayashi, 1943) represents late meraspid instars of C. lobatus (Cederström et al., 1988, p. 500).

References

Agnostida genera
Cambrian trilobites
Cambrian trilobites of Europe
Eodiscina

Cambrian genus extinctions